Government Model Higher Secondary School, Varkala (short names: GMHSS Varkala, GMHSSV) (HSE Code: 01028) is a Higher Secondary School in Varkala (Thiruvananthapuram district) of the Indian state of Kerala. It is operated by the Government of Kerala following the SCERT syllabus. The main campus beside Varkala Maithanam-Beach Road has classes 5 to 12, while a subsidiary compound, LPGS Varkala, offers classes 1 to 4. The current principal is Sri. Rajesh P M.

Courses

GMHSS Varkala provides classes for Bio-Maths Batch (PCMB) and Commerce Batch. HSE classes follow English medium. Secondary education is offered in both Malayalam and English.
GMHSS Varkala has the classes from 5th to +2

Programmes

The teaching methodology follows IT@School Project, which has remodeled conventional teaching methodologies in classrooms through the use of IT. Thus every teacher is allowed laptops.

Campus 

The main campus is situated on the right side of Varkala Maithanam-Beach Road. It comprises many blocks, like the HSS block, Secondary block, UP Block, Auditorium, Laboratory Block etc. It has a sub campus for Primary Education, called LPGS Varkala (locally known as 'Kochu School'(കൊച്ചു സ്കൂള്‍. Malayalam, meaning 'Small School'), although it is not under GMHSS Varkala.

References

Schools in Thiruvananthapuram district
High schools and secondary schools in Kerala
Varkala